Solidarity for Palestinian Human Rights (SPHR) is a non-profit, student-based organization that advocates on a strong social justice platform to uphold the rights of the Palestinian people. The group is based in Montreal, Quebec, Canada and gained a wide profile after instigating a protest in Concordia University, that forced the Israeli ex-Prime Minister Benjamin Netanyahu to cancel a speech that was to take place on 9 September 2002.

In 2009, the organization publicly threatened civil disobedience and unrest in response to the Canada Border Services agency barring then British MP George Galloway from entry into Canada.

Brief history

SPHR was established in 1999 as a result of a merger between two student organizations based at Concordia University and McGill University in Montreal; the Concordia Centre for Palestinian Human Rights (CCPHR) and the McGill Palestinian Solidarity Committee (PSC). It was seen by many that the Oslo Agreement did not stop the threats to the Palestinian people as settlements continued unabated and many sought to highlight the plight of the Palestinian people for the Canadian people.

Having noticed a certain vacuum in the Canadian solidarity movement, the members wanted to create a unique and independent organization which would be able to promote the Palestinian struggle in all of its aspects. It was after a three-month-long discussion that the two boards decided to merge and to consolidate their resources to the furthering of the Palestinian struggle for human rights. The two groups worked on major projects together and consulted each other.  

An effort was made to be open and consultative. Their logic was that they wanted to create an organization which would have enough credibility to be able to appeal to the general public without compromising basic human right principles and facts surrounding the Palestinian plight.  The organization invited prominent speakers such as Norman Finkelstein before he became extremely well-known to those concerned with Palestinian human rights.  The university administrations sought to block SPHR 
in many cases and make it difficult for the members to exercise their freedom of speech.

Head office

In 2001, following an increase in membership and in activities, founding branches decided to establish a structure in charge of acting as a liaison and resource centre for the various campus branches. This structure was to be formally known as SPHR-National.

This new structure was given the responsibility to expand and promote the establishment of SPHRs all across Canada. It also received the mandate to act as a lobby and mobilizing group advocating for Palestinian human rights at both the provincial and federal levels. Moreover, SPHR-National acts as a support structure for branches needing help within their university and student union structures.

Branches

Currently, SPHR has branches in 12 university campuses in Quebec, Ontario, British Columbia, and Alberta in the following universities: Concordia University, McGill University, Université de Montréal, UQAM, University of Ottawa, University of Western Ontario, Carleton University, Queen's University, University of Toronto, University of Toronto at Mississauga, McMaster University, University of British Columbia, University of Calgary, and Toronto Metropolitan University.

References

External links
 SPHR
 SPHR Concordia Chapter
 SPHR Ryerson Chapter

See also
Students for Justice in Palestine

Student organizations in Canada
Non-governmental organizations involved in the Israeli–Palestinian conflict
Political youth organizations in Canada
Palestinian solidarity movement